Judith Godwin (died 25 January 1746) was a noted correspondent of Howel Harris and ancestor of Mary Shelley

Life
Godwin was born in Radnorshire in Wales. She married the academic Samuel Jones. He had founded an academy at Tewkesbury in 1713 which faced difficulties and he had turned to drink. He married Godwin shortly before his death at Tewkesbury on 11 October 1719 aged thirty-seven.

Godwin was a noted correspondent who married Edward Godwin, her husband's former student, in 1721. She held non-conformist views and she was described as "quasi-Methodist". Her friends included Vavasor Griffiths, Howel Harris and Lewis Rees who were all independent ministers. Howel Harris was the religious reformer and they had a long friendship and they exchanged over 40 letters.

Godwin died in Watford, Hertfordshire, on 25 January 1746.

Legacy
Edward and Judith Godwin were the parents of Edward  who was born in 1722 and John Godwin the following year. John was an Independent minister who became the father of radical philosopher and theologian William Godwin, husband and biographer of the philosopher Mary Wollstonecraft. They were the parents of the writer Mary Shelley (and Judith was her grandmother).

References

1746 deaths
Welsh people
Reporters and correspondents